Maria of Portugal is the name of several Portuguese queens, queens consort, princesses and infantas, some of whom reigned as Queen of Spain or other lands:

Queens
 Maria I of Portugal (1734–1816), reigned 1777 to 1816
 Maria II of Portugal (1819–1853), reigned 1826 to 1853

Queens consort
 Maria of Aragon (1482–1517), second wife of Manuel I of Portugal
 Maria Francisca of Savoy (1646–1683), wife of both Afonso VI and Peter II of Portugal
 Maria Sofia of Neuburg (1666–1699), wife of Peter II of Portugal
 Maria Anna of Austria (1683–1754), wife of John V of Portugal
 Maria Leopoldina of Austria (1797–1826), wife of Peter IV of Portugal, I of Brazil
 Maria Pia of Savoy (1847–1911), wife of Louis of Portugal

Infanta and Princesses
 Infanta Maria of Portugal and Flanders (1227 or aft. – aft. 1235), daughter of Ferdinand, Count of Flanders and betrothed of Robert I, Count of Artois
 Infanta Maria of Portugal (nun) (1264–1284), daughter of Afonso III of Portugal
 Maria of Portugal, Lady of Meneses and Orduña (1290–?), daughter of Afonso of Portugal, Lord of Portalegre, wife of Tello Alfonso de Meneses and of Fernando Díaz de Haro
 Infanta Maria of Portugal, Queen of Castile (1313–1357), daughter of Afonso IV of Portugal, queen consort of Castile as wife of Alfonso XI of Castile
 Infanta Maria, Marchioness of Tortosa (1342–1367), daughter of Peter I of Portugal, wife of Ferdinand, Marquess of Tortosa
 Infanta Maria Brites, 2nd Lady of Valencia de Campos (born 1381), daughter of Infante John, Duke of Valencia de Campos, wife of Martim Vasques da Cunha 
 Infanta Maria of Portugal (1432–1432), daughter of Edward of Portugal
 Infanta Maria of Portugal (1511–1513), daughter of Manuel I of Portugal and Maria of Aragon
 Maria of Portugal, Duchess of Viseu (1521–1577), also the daughter of Manuel I of Portugal and Eleanor of Austria
 Maria Manuela, Princess of Portugal (1527–1545), daughter of John III of Portugal, wife of Philip, Prince of Asturias (future Philip II of Spain)
 Infanta Maria of Guimarães (1538–1577), daughter of Infante Edward, 4th Duke of Guimarães, wife of Alexander Farnese, Duke of Parma
 Maria Anna of Spain (1606–1646), daughter of Philip II of Portugal, III of Spain, wife of Ferdinand III, Holy Roman Emperor
Daughters of Philip III of Portugal
 Infanta Maria Margarita (1621–), died young
 Infanta Maria Eugenia (1625–1627), died young
 Infanta Maria Ana Antónia of Spain (1636–1636), died young
 Maria Theresa of Spain (1638–1683), queen consort of France as wife of Louis XIV of France
 Infanta Maria Ambrosia de la Concepción (1655–1655), died young
Daughters of John V of Portugal
 Infanta Maria Barbara of Portugal (1711–1758), queen consort of Spain as wife of Ferdinand VI of Spain
Daughters of Joseph I of Portugal
 Infanta Maria Ana Francisca Josefa of Portugal (1736–1813)
 Infanta Maria Francisca Doroteia of Portugal (1739–1771)
Daughters of Maria I and Peter III of Portugal
 Infanta Maria Isabel of Portugal (1766–1777)
 Infanta Mariana of Portugal (1768–1788), wife of Infante Gabriel of Spain
 Infanta Maria Clementina of Portugal (1774–1776)
Daughters of John VI of Portugal
 Maria Teresa, Princess of Beira (1793–1874), wife of Infante Pedro Carlos of Spain and Portugal and then of Infante Carlos of Spain
 Maria Isabel of Portugal (1797–1818), queen consort of Spain as wife of Ferdinand VII of Spain
 Infanta Maria Francisca of Portugal (1800–1834), married Infante Carlos of Spain
 Infanta Maria da Assunção of Portugal (1805–1834)
Daughters of Maria II and Ferdinand II of Portugal
 Infanta Maria of Portugal (1840–1840)
 Infanta Maria Anna of Portugal (1843–1884), wife of George, Crown Prince of Saxony
 Infanta Maria da Glória of Portugal (1851–1851)
Daughters of Miguel of Portugal
Infanta Maria das Neves of Portugal (1852–1941), Duchess of San Jaime as wife of Alfonso Carlos, Duke of San Jaime
Infanta Maria Theresa of Portugal (1855–1944), Archduchess of Austria as wife of Archduke Carl Ludwig of Austria
Infanta Maria Josepha of Portugal (1857–1943), Duchess in Bavaria as wife of Carl Theodor, Duke in Bavaria
Infanta Marie Anne of Portugal (1861–1942), Grand Duchess consort of Luxembourg as wife of Guillaume IV, Grand Duke of Luxembourg
Infanta Maria Antonia of Portugal (1862–1959), Duchess of Parma as wife of Robert I, Duke of Parma
Infanta Maria Ana of Portugal (1888), daughter of Carlos I of Portugal